State Road 134 is a very short north–south state road in Marion County.

Route description

History
SR 134 was added to the state road system between late 1930 and 1931, on the same route as it currently takes, within its first year the road was treated with oil. The road entire length of SR 134 was paved in 1932. Since the early 1930s not much has changed with SR 134.

Major intersections

References

External links

134
Transportation in Indianapolis
Transportation in Marion County, Indiana
State highways in the United States shorter than one mile